Eusebio Figueroa Oreamuno  (1827–1883) was a Costa Rican politician.

Vice presidents of Costa Rica
1827 births
1883 deaths
Foreign ministers of Costa Rica
Supreme Court of Justice of Costa Rica judges